(1326 – ) reigned from 1334 to 1338 and was one of two Sei-i Taishōguns during the Kenmu Restoration. He was also Crown Prince in 1336 (one month).

He was a son of the Emperor Go-Daigo and Fujiwara no Renshi (藤原廉子, also called Ano Renshi 阿野廉子), daughter of Ano Kinkado. His brothers-uterine were Crown Prince Tsunenaga and Emperor Go-Murakami.

On 17 November 1336 Prince Narinaga became Crown Prince to Emperor Kōmyō. However, Ashikaga Takauji had the prince killed in 1337 when Go-Daigo continued to resist.

Alternatively, Narinaga was placed with Konoe Mototsugu after deposal and died in 1344 (according to Diary by Nakahara no Moromori, 師守記).

References

Further reading
 Owada, T. et al. (2003). Nihonshi Shoka Keizu Jinmei Jiten. Kodansha. (Japanese)
 Mori, S.. (1988). Mikotachi no Namboku-cho. Chuokoron-Shinsha. (Japanese)
 Kodama, K.. (1978). Nihon-shi Shō-jiten, Tennō. Kondō Shuppan-sha. (Japanese)

1326 births
1337 deaths
1344 deaths
14th-century Japanese people
14th-century shōguns
Japanese princes
Shōguns
Sons of emperors
Heirs apparent who never acceded